Jacques Martineau (born 8 July 1963) is a French film director and screenwriter who works in collaboration with partner Olivier Ducastel.

Life and career 
After spending his adolescence in Nice, Martineau moved to Paris to study at the Ecole Normale Supérieure.  After graduating, he took up a teaching post at the facility.

In 1995 Martineau met Olivier Ducastel, and the two began a professional and personal relationship.  Their first collaborative venture, Jeanne et le Garçon formidable (an HIV/AIDS-themed musical comedy inspired by the films of Jacques Demy and featuring Virginie Ledoyen and Demy's son Mathieu), was released in 1998. The film was entered into the 48th Berlin International Film Festival.

Ducastel and Martineau have since directed further films with gay-related storylines, including the ambitious, almost three-hour-long Nés en 68 starring Laetitia Casta and Yannick Renier.

Martineau currently combines film work with a lectureship at Paris X University Nanterre.

Filmography

References

External links

1963 births
Living people
École Normale Supérieure alumni
French film directors
French male screenwriters
LGBT film directors
Mass media people from Montpellier
French gay writers